Sony Ericsson mobile phones

Sony Ericsson T290 is a cellphone released by Sony Ericsson in 2004. It has a 700 mAh Li-Ion battery, a 101x80 pixels screen. It weighs 78 grams and has no Bluetooth or infrared. The T290 is very similar to Sony Ericsson T230, apart from speakerphone mode.

Variants

External links 
https://www.gsmarena.com/sony_ericsson_t290-909.php